Rachel Pellaud (born 8 March 1995) is a Swiss athlete. She competed in the women's 4 × 400 metres relay event at the 2019 World Athletics Championships.

References

External links

1995 births
Living people
Swiss female sprinters
Place of birth missing (living people)
World Athletics Championships athletes for Switzerland
European Games competitors for Switzerland
Athletes (track and field) at the 2019 European Games
Athletes (track and field) at the 2020 Summer Olympics
Olympic athletes of Switzerland
21st-century Swiss women